State Road 5 (SR 5) is a mostly-unsigned state highway in the state of Florida. It is mainly signed as US 1 from its south end in Key West, Florida to Jacksonville, Florida, and US 17 from Jacksonville to the Georgia state line at the Saint Marys River. US 1 is SR 15 northwest from Jacksonville.

However, from northern Lantana through Lake Worth to Belvedere Road in West Palm Beach, SR 5 is separate from US 1, which runs to the west on the older but wider Dixie Highway. Here, SR 5 runs along a road named Olive Avenue.

Route description
SR 5 uses the parallel Olive Avenue from just north of County Road 812 (Lantana Road) in Lantana until Belvedere Road in West Palm Beach, where it turns west one block to rejoin Dixie Highway and US 1. Olive Avenue and Dixie Highway are parallel and extremely close to each other for this entire length. Olive Avenue is also signed as Federal Highway, but this name is not used as much.

History

Until around 2004, Olive Avenue carried northbound US 1 (and SR 5) north from Dixie Highway (new US 1 / SR 805) to SR A1A. In 2004, US 1 was re-routed onto Dixie Highway without SR 5. Afterwards, FDOT started periodically relinquishing SR 5 in fragments between July 1, 2004 and April 7, 2011. FDOT has relinquished all of former SR 5 in the city of West Palm Beach. Therefore, SR 5 has a gap starting at the West Palm Beach-Lake Worth city line, and resumes at the US 1 intersection with Belvedere Road in West Palm Beach.

Major intersections

References

005
005
005
005
005
005
005
005
005
005
005
005
005
005
005
005
005
005
005
005
Dixie Highway
1945 establishments in Florida